National Highway 730S, commonly referred to as NH 730S is a national highway in India. It is a secondary route of National Highway 30.  NH-730S runs in the state of Uttar Pradesh in India.

Route 
NH730S connects Mahrajganj, Nichlaul and Thuthibari on Indo/Nepal Border in the state of Uttar Pradesh.

Junctions  
 
  Terminal near Mahrajganj.

See also 
 List of National Highways in India
 List of National Highways in India by state

References

External links 

 NH 730S on OpenStreetMap

National highways in India
National Highways in Uttar Pradesh